John Tasker may refer to:

 John Tasker (sea captain) (1742–1800)
 John Tasker (cricketer) (1887–1975), British cricketer
 John Tasker (theatre director) ( – 1988), Australian theatre director
 John Tasker (1659–1730/31), son-in-law of Thomas Brooke Jr.
 John Tasker (jockey) (died 1855), rode in 1850 Grand National